Claire Titelman is an American actress and stand-up comedian best known for her regular appearances as a roundtable panelist on Chelsea Lately, as well as her roles on Parks and Recreation, New Girl and Veronica Mars.

Theatrical work
Titelman wrote and acted in Lemons Are for Emergencies Only, which was performed in her own kitchen in Los Angeles in 2006 before appearing at the Edinburgh Festival Fringe in 2007. Her play In Tubes was produced at HERE Arts in NYC, and her solo show Filthy was performed at experimental Los Angeles theater Machine Project in 2015.

She is a member of the Wet the Hippo collective (Best Comedy nominee at L.A. Fringe Festival) and a graduate of Upright Citizens Brigade.

Claire performed in the October 2011 edition of Don't Tell My Mother!, as well as the subsequent Best of Don't Tell My Mother! at the Comedy Central stage in June 2012. She was named one of "8 L.A. Artists and Art-World Figures to Watch in 2016" by LA Weekly.

Filmography

Film

Television

References

External links

American film actresses
American television actresses
Year of birth missing (living people)
Living people
21st-century American women